Lake Alvin is an artificial lake in Lincoln County, South Dakota between Harrisburg, South Dakota and Granite, Iowa.  The lake is formed by a dam on Nine Mile Creek just before it enters the Big Sioux River, east of Harrisburg. It is part of a  recreational area.

History
Lake Alvin has always been a popular swimming location for those looking for a mid-sized beach. However, in 2005, the South Dakota GFP closed the swimming beach to the public due to high levels of coliform bacteria in the lake. A shutdown was again issued in 2009, 2013, 2014, and 2020 due to high levels of coliform bacteria.

External links
 SD Game, Fish, and Parks fish report for Lake Alvin
 Lake Alvin Recreation Area

References

Alvin
Protected areas of Lincoln County, South Dakota
Bodies of water of Lincoln County, South Dakota